Down the hill is used as a colloquial name for multiple specific geographic locations. These include:

 The Cajon Pass, as referred to by the High Desert, California area between Los Angeles, California and Las Vegas, Nevada in the United States
 The residential neighborhoods in East Baltimore, Maryland, USA, between Johns Hopkins Hospital and Frank C. Bocek Park, including:
 Milton-Montford, Baltimore 
 Madison-Eastend, Baltimore